Project English is the fifth studio album by Southern rapper Juvenile. The album was released August 21, 2001, by Cash Money and Universal. The album was supported by one single, "Set It Off". Project English reached #2 on the Billboard 200 during the week of September 7, 2001. On October 24, 2001, Project English was certified Gold for shipping 500,000 copies.

Track listing
 All songs produced by Mannie Fresh.

Charts

Weekly charts

Year-end charts

Certifications

References

Juvenile (rapper) albums
2001 albums
Albums produced by Mannie Fresh